The 1989 IAAF World Women's Road Race Championships was the seventh edition of the annual international road running competition organised by the International Amateur Athletics Federation (IAAF). The competition was hosted by Brazil on 24 September 1989 in Rio de Janeiro and featured one race only: a 15K run for women. There were individual and team awards available, with the national team rankings being decided by the combined finishing positions of a team's top three runners. Countries with fewer than three finishers were not ranked.

The race was won by Wang Xiuting of China, who had been runner-up to Ingrid Kristiansen the previous year. She ran 49:34 minutes to finish ten seconds ahead of the runner-up, teammate Zhong Huandi, with former champion Aurora Cunha of Portugal in third place. With Wang Huabi in seventh, the Chinese team achieved a championship record-low score of ten points. The Portuguese women achieved the lowest non-winning score in championship history, with 15 points, with Cunha being followed home by fourth placed Albertina Machado and Albertina Dias in eighth. Showing the dominance of the race by a handful of nations, a Yekaterina Khramenkova-led Soviet Union also achieved the lowest ever score for third place on 24 points.

Results

Individual

Team

References

1989
IAAF World Women's Road Race Championships
IAAF World Women's Road Race Championships
IAAF World Women's Road Race Championships
International sports competitions in Rio de Janeiro (city)
International athletics competitions hosted by Brazil
Athletics in Rio de Janeiro (city)